Open Up Your Heart is an album by Buck Owens and his Buckaroos, released in 1966. It reached Number one on the Billboard Country Albums chart.

It was re-released on CD in 1995 by Sundazed Records.

Reception

In his Allmusic review, critic Stephen Thomas Erlewine wrote "...while it is still firmly within his trademark Bakersfield sound, there are slight moves away from his twangy, purer material and toward material that was just a little sillier and a little poppier... Open Up Your Heart doesn't resonate quite as strongly as earlier efforts from Owens, nor does it warrant as many repeat plays, but it is still crafted and played well enough to make it a satisfying listen."

Track listing

Side one
 "Open Up Your Heart" (Buck Owens) – 2:28
 "Congratulations, You're Absolutely Right" (Owens, Don Rich, Red Simpson) – 2:38
 "Think of Me" (Olson, Rich) – 2:15
 "In the Palm of Your Hand" (Owens) – 2:25
 "You, You, Only You" (Rich, Simpson) – 2:06
 "Sam's Place" (Owens, Simpson) – 1:59

Side two
 "Waitin' in Your Welfare Line" (Owens, Rich, Nat Stuckey) – 2:18
 "A Devil Like Me (Needs an Angel Like You)" (Rich, Simpson) – 2:09
 "Heart of Glass" (Owens, Simpson) – 2:09
 "Cadillac Lane" (Owens, Simpson) – 2:22
 "No More Me and You" (Owens) – 2:03
 "Goodbye, Good Luck, God Bless You" (Owens) – 2:12
1995 bonus tracks:
 "Open Up Your Heart" (Owens) – 2:27
 "Think of Me" (Estella Olson, Don Rich) – 2:13

Recorded
August 23, 1965, Capitol Recording Studio, Hollywood (6,9)
August 24, 1965, Capitol Recording Studio, Hollywood (4,7)
February 15, 1966, Capitol Recording Studio, Hollywood (3,11)
April 1966, Capitol Recording Studio, Hollywood (1,2,5,8,10,12)

References

1966 albums
Buck Owens albums
Capitol Records albums
Albums produced by Ken Nelson (United States record producer)

Albums recorded at Capitol Studios